Charged multivesicular body protein 4a is a protein that in humans is encoded by the CHMP4A gene.

References

External links

Further reading